is Japanese idol and model. She is a former member and former vice captain of the idol group Sakurazaka46. Like other members, Moriya is represented by Sony Music Labels.

Biography
Born in Miyagi Prefecture, Moriya passed her first-year member audition of Keyakizaka46 on 21 August 2015 and started her activities.

During a handshake event on 21 January 2017, Moriya was named the vice captain of Keyakizaka46. On September 16, 2017, she made her runway debut at the fashion and music event GirlsAward 2017 AUTUMN／WINTER, held at the Makuhari Messe. She is also part of the subgroup  along with Rika Watanabe, Risa Watanabe, Yūka Sugai and Manaka Shida. As part of the subunit, Moriya made appearances in three songs: "Aozora Chigau" in "Sekai ni wa Ai Shika Nai", "Wareta Sumaho" in "Fukyōwaon, and "Namiuchigiwa o Hashiranai ka?" in "Kaze ni Fukarete mo". 

On 8 May 2019, Shogakukan announced that they will be publishing a photo-book featuring Moriya that was photographed in Monaco. She became the seventh member in Keyakizaka46 to have a photobook, behind Rika Watanabe, Neru Nagahama, Yūka Sugai, Yui Imaizumi, Yui Kobayashi, and Risa Watanabe.

In January 2021, following Keyakizaka46's rebranding into Sakurazaka46 in October 2020, it was announced that Moriya would step down as vice captain. She was succeeded by second generation member Rina Matsuda.

Discography

Singles

Videos

Filmography

Events

Bibliography

Photobook Release 
On May 8, 2019, it was announced that Akane Moriya will release her first photo collection.

References

External links
 
 
 
 

1997 births
Living people
Japanese female models
Japanese idols
Keyakizaka46 members
Musicians from Miyagi Prefecture
Sakurazaka46 members